Barcroft Henry Thomas Boake (26 March 1866 – 2 May 1892) was an Australian poet.

Background 
Born in Sydney, Boake worked as a surveyor and a boundary rider, but is best remembered for his poetry, a volume of which was published five years after his death.

Boake was eldest son of Barcroft Capel Boake (b. Dublin, 1838) and his wife Florence Eva, née Clarke (1846–1879).

In July 1886 Boake joined E. Commins, a surveyor, and had experience as a field-assistant, working for some time in the Monaro (New South Wales). After spending two years in the surveying camp Boake was disinclined to return to the city, took service as a boundary rider, and worked in New South Wales and Queensland. In May 1890 Boake joined W. A. Lipscomb, a surveyor, and remained with him until the end of 1891. About this time he began to send verses to The Bulletin, which were published.

His poems were all published posthumously in 1897 by A.G. Stephens in a collection titled "Where the Dead Men Lie: and Other Poems". "Where the Dead Men Lie" was the most famous of his poems, which described the tragedies Australians faced during the 1891–93 depression.  Scottish-Australian poet and bush balladeer Will H. Ogilvie (1869–1963) penned The land of dumb despair (1898) in memoriam to Boake.

Boake is believed to have committed suicide. His body was found hanging by the neck from a stockwhip at Long Bay, North Sydney eight days after he disappeared on 2 May 1892. One writer on Boake's life has mentioned that the suicide took place during the 1891–93 depression when the poet was unable to find work, also noting that "it has been suggested that he killed himself for the love of one of the McKeahnie girls," sisters of the horseman Charlie McKeahnie.

Notes

Bibliography 
 Barcroft Boake. Where the Dead Men Lie, and Other Poems 1897

Individual poems 
 "Jack's Last Muster" (1890)
 "Where the Dead Men Lie" (1891)

References 
 Hugh Capel. "Tragic End for a Bush Poet," The Canberra Times, 27 March 2002
 
 Cecil Hadgraft, 'Boake, Barcroft Henry Thomas (1866–1892)', Australian Dictionary of Biography, Volume 3, MUP, 1969, pp 186–187.

External links 
 Barcroft Henry Boake at Boake.net
 Barcroft Boake (1866–1892) at Middlemiss.org
 Boake.info | Boake Family Genealogy
 
 

1866 births
1892 deaths
Australian male poets
Suicides by hanging in New South Wales
19th-century Australian poets
19th-century male writers
Burials at Rookwood Cemetery
1890s suicides